John Rowe may refer to:

Businessmen
John Rowe (Exelon), head of Chicago energy concern Exelon Corporation
John Rowe (Aetna) (born 1944), former CEO and executive chairman of U.S. health care benefits company Aetna

Others
John Rowe (minister) (1626–1677), English clergyman
John Rowe (actor) (born 1941), British actor
John Rowe (naval officer), navy officer of the U.S. Navy during the First Barbary War
John Rowe (merchant) (1715–1787), merchant and politician in Boston, Massachusetts, during the American Revolution 
John Rowe (author) (1936–2017), Australian author
John Howland Rowe (1918–2004), American anthropologist
John Rowe (Australian politician) (1816–1886), member of South Australian parliament
Jack Rowe (1856–1911), American baseball player for the Buffalo Bisons
John Tetley Rowe (1861–1915), Anglican priest

See also
John Row (disambiguation)
John Roe (disambiguation)
Johnny Rowe (footballer) (fl. 1907–1940), English footballer
Jonathan Rowe (disambiguation)